Albuñol is a city located in the province of Granada, Spain. According to the 2007 census, the city has a population of 6,270 inhabitants.

History 

It is believed that its origin is Roman, but remains have been found of a prehistoric settlement in the Cave of Bats, located in the municipality of Albuñol. The heyday of the Alpujarra was the Moors, at the time Albuñol contained the largest population of Great Cehel or Gran Costa. It was in these centuries Albuñol was defended by the castle of La Rábita. In the sixteenth century Portocarrero Luis Zapata bought the population to the Crown, Dona Juana, also receiving the award of city status. After the expulsion of the Moors in 1570 began the repopulation of the Alpujarra with Castile, Galicia and Leon, but Albuñol did not occur until the seventeenth century. In 1834 he became head of the judicial district of the same name, currently the headquarters is located in Motril.

Festivities

Among the traditions of the town is very Arriagada craft activities in the area such as manufacturing esparto or other materials. It is also called the great tradition of winemaking in the area, unique for its taste and graduation. Among the monuments of the town, one of the fundamentals is the Parroquia de San Patricio whose origin is in the fifteenth century. Despite being a small town, Albuñol has several festivities throughout the year. Patronal Feast of St. Patrick on March 17 held by the town's streets the procession of the patron of Albuñol along with San Jose. Fiesta de San Marcos April 25, protector of cattle. Summer Fair: the first weekend of August. Cattle Fair: from 30 October to 1 November. Castles In particular it celebrates its Patronal Fiesta in honor of San Pedro from 27 to 29 June. (The Rábita): Fiesta de San Isidro Labrador, May 15, Feast of San Juan which is held every June 23; Fiestas Patronal of Nuestra Señora La Virgen del Mar every September 8. In El Pozuelo, fiestas in honor of Santiago Apostle on 25 June. In 1986 was held in this population, the V Festival of Traditional Music of the Alpujarra.

References

External links 
Albuñol - Sistema de Información Multiterritorial de Andalucía
English News Magazine for the Region

Municipalities in the Province of Granada